Ivan Rusev Atanasov (born 6 May 1993) is a Bulgarian badminton player.

Achievements

BWF International Challenge/Series (6 titles, 8 runners-up) 
Men's singles

Men's doubles

  BWF International Challenge tournament
  BWF International Series tournament
  BWF Future Series tournament

References

External links 
 

1993 births
Living people
Bulgarian male badminton players
21st-century Bulgarian people